Erkki Gustaf Melartin (7 February 1875, Käkisalmi – 14 February 1937, Helsinki) was a Finnish composer, conductor, and teacher of the late-Romantic and early-modern periods. Melartin is generally considered to be one of Finland's most significant national Romantic composers, although his music—then and now—largely has been overshadowed by that of his exact contemporary, Jean Sibelius, the country's most famous composer. The core of Melartin's  consists of a set of six (completed) symphonies, as well as is his opera, Aino, based on a story from the Kalevala, Finland's national epic, but nevertheless in the style of Richard Wagner.

Melartin's other notable works include the popular wedding tune, Festive March (1904; from the incidental music to the play, Sleeping Beauty); the symphonic poem, Traumgesicht (1910); the Violin Concerto in D minor (1913); the Kalevalic symphonic poem for soprano and orchestra, Marjatta (1914); The Blue Pearl, Finland's first large-scale ballet (1930); and a set of four string quartets, composed between 1896 and 1910. In addition, a number of Melartin's songs for solo voice and piano have found a lasting place in the Finnish repertoire. Two additional projected symphonies, the Seventh and Eighth, might have further solidified his reputation, both within Finland and internationally, but the development of each was cut short by Melartin's death, at age 62.

Career
As well as composing, Melartin also taught and directed music at the Helsinki Music College, later the Helsinki Conservatory. His students included composer and conductor Heidi Sundblad-Halme. As conductor of the Vyborg Orchestra in 1908–11, and despite chronic health problems, Melartin toured extensively (as far as North Africa and India), conducting the first performance of Gustav Mahler's music in Scandinavia, the slow movement of the Resurrection symphony in 1909.

Although Melartin was chiefly a lyricist, the symphony was central to his musical output. He wrote six symphonies (1902–1924) and was the first Finnish composer to bear Mahler's influence. The fourth symphony uses a vocalise like that of Carl Nielsen's Sinfonia Espansiva. The fifth is a Sinfonia brevis ending in a fugue and chorale, while the sixth, harmonically more advanced than the other five, advances stepwise from a C minor first movement – with evocations of Mahler's Resurrection symphony – to an E-flat major finale. His musical output also includes an opera, Aino (based on the character from the Finnish national epic, the Kalevala), a violin concerto, four string quartets, and many piano pieces. His works therefore are divided mainly into large-scale works for orchestra, and chamber pieces for much smaller groups and soloists. Despite working in the same time period as Jean Sibelius he was not influenced by the more famous composer's style, and his work has been largely overshadowed by that of Finland's most revered composer.

The Juhlamarssi (Festive March) from his ballet Sleeping Beauty is the most popular wedding march in Finland.

Selected compositions

Stage 
 Aino, Opera in 2 acts, Op. 50 (1912)
 Sininen helmi (The Blue Pearl), Ballet, Op. 160 (1930)
 Prinsessa Ruusunen (Sleeping Beauty), incidental music, Op. 22 (1904)

Orchestral 
 Symphony No. 1 in C minor, Op. 30 No. 1 (1902)
 Siikajoki, Symphonic Poem, Op. 28 (1903)
 Symphony No. 2 in E minor, Op. 30 No. 2 (1904)
 Prinsessa Ruusunen (Sleeping Beauty), Suite from incidental music, Op. 22 (1904, 1911)
 Symphony No. 3 in F major, Op. 40 (1906–07) / Score, preface in English
 Traumgesicht, Symphonic Poem, Op. 70 (1910) / Score, preface in English
 Patria, Symphonic Poem, Op. 72 (1911)
 Marjatta, Symphonic Song for soprano and orchestra Op. 79 (1014) / Score, preface in English
 Symphony No. 4 "Kesäsinfonia" (Summer Symphony) in E major, Op. 80 (1912) / Score, preface in English
 Lyric Suite No. 3 "Impressions de Belgique", EM144 (1915-1916)
 Symphony No. 5 "Sinfonia brevis" in A minor, Op. 90 (1915) / Score, preface in English
 Symphony No. 6, Op. 100 (1924)
 Divertimento, Op. 152 (1928)
 Intermezzo, Op. 147 (1929)
 Sininen helmi, Suite from the ballet, Op. 160 (1930)
 Symphony No. 7 "Sinfonia gaia", Op. 149 (1935–1936, part 1 ready, sketches for other parts)
 Symphony No. 8, Op. 186 (1936–1937, unfinished and fragmental)
 Symphony No. 9, OP. 188 (1930's, just some structural plans exist)
 Concerto in D minor for violin and orchestra, Op. 60 (1913)

Chamber music 
 String Quartet No. 1 in E minor, Op. 36 No. 1 (1896)
 Sonata for violin and piano (1899)
 String Quartet No. 2 in G minor, Op. 36 No. 2 (1900)
 String Quartet No. 3 in E, Op. 36 No. 3 (1902)
 String Quartet No. 4 in F, Op. 62 (1910)
 Nocturne for violin and piano, Op. 64 No. 1
 Kuusi helppoa kappaletta (6 Easy Pieces) for cello (or violin) and piano, Op.121
 String Trio, Op. 133 (1927)
 Sonata for flute and harp, Op. 135a (1927)
 Sonata for brass, Op. 153 (1929)
 Trio for flute, clarinet and bassoon, Op. 154 (1929)
 Pieni kvartetto (Little Quartet) for four horns, Op. 185

Piano 
 Marionetteja (Marionnettes), Suite for piano 4 hands, Op. 1 (1899)
 2 Ballads, Op. 5 (1899)
 Lastuja I (Chips I), 6 pieces, Op. 7 (1900)
 3 Pieces, Op. 8 (1899)
 Lastuja II (Chips II), 6 pieces, Op. 9 (1900)
 Skizzer, 5 Pieces, Op. 11
 Legend II, Op. 12 (1900)
 Lastuja III (Chips III), 5 pieces, Op. 34 (1906)
 Lastuja IV (Chips IV), 5 pieces, Op. 48 (1907)
 Surullinen puutarha (The Melancholy Garden), 5 Pieces, Op. 52 (1908)
 Lyric Pieces, Op. 59 (1909)
 4 Pieces, Op. 75
 9 Little Pieces, Op. 76
 Album Leaves, Op. 83
 4 Sonatinas, Op. 84
 24 Preludes, Op. 85 (1913–20)
 Noli me tangere, Op. 87 (1914)
 3 Pieces, Op. 98 (1916?)
 Skuggspel, 7 Pieces, Op.104
 Fantasia apocaliptica, Op. 111 (1921)
 6 Pieces, Op. 118 (1923)
   No. 2 The Mysterious Forest
 6 Pieces, Op. 123 (1924–1925)

Vocal 
 3 Songs for voice and piano, Op. 13
 Kansanlaulua Käkisalmelta (Folk Songs from Kexholm), Op. 55
 5 Songs for voice and piano, Op. 69
 3 Songs for voice and piano, Op. 77
 3 Songs for voice and piano, Op. 86
 4 Songs for voice and piano, Op. 95

References

Further reading 
 Pitkäranta, Inkeri: "Erkki Melartin Painter, Composer, Philosopher" Finnish Music Quarterly 1/2000 pp. 2–7.

External links 
Erkki Melartin Society
Ondine Records Melartin Site
Musical Finland in Brussels

Song by Vilhelm Krag and Erkki Melartin
Erkki Melartin on Victor Records
O, Herre: 1918 recording by Eleonora Olson
O, Herre: lyrics by Vilhelm Krag

1875 births
1937 deaths
People from Priozersk
People from Viipuri Province (Grand Duchy of Finland)
Finnish conductors (music)
Finnish classical composers
Finnish opera composers
Male opera composers
20th-century classical composers
Finnish male classical composers
Burials at Hietaniemi Cemetery
20th-century conductors (music)
20th-century male musicians
20th-century Finnish composers